Linda Greenlaw (born December 22, 1960) is a best-selling author of books with maritime themes and the only female swordfishing boat captain on the East Coast of the United States. She was featured in the 1997 book The Perfect Storm and the film The Perfect Storm.

Greenlaw wrote three best-selling books about life as a commercial fisher: The Hungry Ocean in 1999, The Lobster Chronicles in 2002 and All Fishermen Are Liars in 2002.

Her books have climbed as high as No. 2 on the New York Times bestseller list, with The Hungry Ocean remaining on the list for three months.

Greenlaw lives on Isle au Haut, Maine, and was the first female sword-fishing boat captain on the American East Coast.

Early life
Greenlaw was born in Connecticut, the daughter of Jim and Martha Greenlaw. Her father was an information systems manager for Bath Iron Works. She was raised in Topsham, Maine, and her family spent their summers in Isle au Haut, a village of 70 people off the coast of Maine. Greenlaw attended Colby College, where she majored in both English and government. To help pay her way through college, Linda worked as a cook and deckhand aboard the sword-fishing boat Walter Leeman during her summers. She continued working on the boat during free time and vacations and, after her graduation in 1983, continued working for the boat's owner, Alden Leeman, who installed Greenlaw as a swordfish captain in 1986 when he acquired a second vessel.

Greenlaw wrote in The Hungry Ocean: "Being a woman hasn't been a big deal. I never anticipated problems stemming from being female, and never encountered any. I have been surprised, even embarrassed, by the number of people who are genuinely amazed that a woman might be capable of running a fishing boat."

Career

Commercial fisherman
Greenlaw was the captain of the Hannah Boden in October 1991 when Andrea Gail sank in the Atlantic in the 1991 Perfect Storm. Greenlaw's efforts to warn the Andrea Gail about the impending storm were portrayed in Sebastian Junger's 1997 book The Perfect Storm and in the movie version, in which she was played by Mary Elizabeth Mastrantonio. Junger called Greenlaw not just the only female swordfishing captain, but "one of the best captains, period, on the entire East Coast."

In 1997, Greenlaw settled in Isle au Haut, and bought a lobster boat, the 35-foot Mattie Belle.

On May 28, 2009, Greenlaw was convicted of illegally entering and illegally fishing in Canadian waters by the Provincial Court of Newfoundland and Labrador. The Crown asked for a fine of CAD$53,000, while the defense recommended a fine of half that amount. She was fined $38,000 after the judge found she did not use "due diligence".

Writer
 
Greenlaw's first book, The Hungry Ocean (1999), described a one-month swordfishing voyage, entailing, "among other things, treacherous weather, uncooperative fish, wildly entertaining shipmates, and the exhausting, mind-bending pressure of ten consecutive 21-hour days." Subsequent books include The Lobster Chronicles: Life on a Very Small Island (2002), All Fishermen Are Liars: True Tales from the Dry Dock Bar (2004), Seaworthy: A Swordboat Captain Returns to the Sea (2010), and Lifesaving Lessons: Notes from an Accidental Mother (2013). Greenlaw has co-authored two cookbooks with her mother, Martha Greenlaw, and published four novels of detective fiction—Slipknot (2007), Fisherman's Bend (2008), Shiver Hitch (2017) and Bimini Twist (2018) — all the names of knots and featuring her fictional detective Jane Bunker.

Awards
Greenlaw was the winner of the American Library Association's Alex Award in 2000, United States Maritime Literature Award in 2003, and the New England Book Award for nonfiction in 2004.

Bibliography

Cookbooks

Maritime

Memoir

Mystery

References

External links
 Profile in Bookreporter.com
 Linda Greenlaw website
 Reading by Linda Greenlaw in Portland, Maine, courtesy of the Maine Humanities Council

1960 births
Living people
21st-century American novelists
American fishers
American non-fiction writers
American mystery writers
American sailors
Colby College alumni
Female sailors
Maritime writers
Novelists from Connecticut
People from Knox County, Maine
People from Topsham, Maine
Women mystery writers
American women novelists
1991 Perfect Storm
American sportswomen
American women non-fiction writers
21st-century American women writers